Frits Poelman is a former football (soccer) player who represented New Zealand at international level.

Poelman played two official A-international matches for the New Zealand in 1954, both 2-1 wins over New Caledonia, the first on 31 August, the second on 14 September 1958.

In club football for Hamilton Technical Old Boys, Poelman played alongside brother Klaas Poelman, who played two representative matches for New Zealand but gained no A-international caps.

Poelman played in an Auckland provincial team who recorded a notable win at Blandford Park over FK Austria Wien, many time club champions of Austria. In contrast to the 7–1 loss recorded by the New Zealand national side. The provincial side packed with immigrants not eligible for New Zealand national football team selection, recorded a convincing 3–0 win.

Honours
 1962 Chatham Cup

References 

Year of birth missing (living people)
Living people
New Zealand association footballers
New Zealand international footballers
Association football defenders